"Red and Rio Grande" is a song co-written and recorded by American country music artist Doug Supernaw.  It was released in February 1994 as the fourth single and title track from the album Red and Rio Grande.  The song reached #23 on the Billboard Hot Country Singles & Tracks chart.  The song was written by Supernaw and Lonnie Atkinson.

Chart performance

References

1994 singles
1994 songs
Doug Supernaw songs
Song recordings produced by Richard Landis
BNA Records singles